The 2012 Champions Tour was the 33rd season for the golf tour now known as PGA Tour Champions since it officially began in 1980 as the Senior PGA Tour. The season consisted of 24 official money events with purses totaling $$46,700,000, including five majors. Bernhard Langer topped the end-of-season money list, winning $2,140,296. Eight golfers won two tournaments each. Fred Couples led the tour in scoring average. The tournament results, leaders, and award winners are listed below.

Tournament results
The following table shows all the official money events for the 2012 season. "Date" is the ending date of the tournament. The numbers in parentheses after the winners' names are the number of wins they had on the tour up to and including that event. Senior majors are shown in bold. No golfer won on his Champions Tour debut this season.

Leaders
Scoring Average leaders

Source:

Money List leaders

Source:

Career Money List leaders

Source:

Awards

See also
Champions Tour awards
Champions Tour records

References

External links
PGA Tour Champions official site

PGA Tour Champions seasons
Champions Tour